50 Minute Technicolor Dream is a compilation album that consists of mostly previously unreleased recordings by Tomorrow. Tracks 1-2 are unused demos for the film Blowup.
Tracks 7-8 are from BBC Radio 1: "Top Gear" (the first "Peel Session", recorded September 21, 1967), recorded at Maida Vale Studios. Tracks 9-16 are live at "Christmas On Earth Continued" Friday, December 22, 1967, recorded at Kensington Olympia Grand & National Halls.

Reception

AllMusic writer Richie Unterberger was positive about the album, writing that the album was interesting to listen to, and praised the liner notes.

Track listing
"Am I Glad to See You" - 4:29
"Blow Up" - 1:53
"Caught in a Web" - 3:08
"Revolution" - 3:48 (Hopkins/Howe)  
"Why" - 3:57
"Real Life Permanent Dream" - 3:16
"Three Jolly Little Dwarfs" - 2:26
"Revolution" - 4:11 
"Caught in a Web" (live) - 3:22
"Shotgun & the Duck" (live) - 5:53
"My White Bicycle" (live) - 3:07 (Hopkins/Burgess)
"Real Life Permanent Dream" (live) - 2:32
"Revolution" (live) - 3:32
"Why" (live) - 3:22
"Mr Rainbow" (live) - 2:41
"Strawberry Fields Forever" (live) - 4:08 (Lennon/McCartney)

Personnel
Keith West – vocals
Steve Howe – guitar
John "Twink" Alder – drums
John "Junior" Wood – bass guitar

References

Steve Howe (musician) albums
Peel Sessions recordings
1998 live albums
1998 compilation albums